A Better World is singer/songwriter Chris de Burgh's twenty-first original album, released on 23 September 2016.

This album peaked at number 7 in the German album chart, and reached number 60 in the UK Albums Chart. It also charted in Switzerland, Belgium, Austria and the Netherlands.

Track listing
All songs written by Chris de Burgh.
"Hope in the Human Heart" - 0:54
"Bethlehem" - 4:12
"Once in a Lifetime" - 3:44
"The Open Door" - 3:50
"Heart and Soul" - 2:44
"Chain of Command" - 3:38
"Confession" - 3:00
"Homeland" - 4:32
"Cry No More" - 3:07
"Shipboard Romance" - 2:56
"Falling Rain" - 3:08
"All For Love" - 3:59
"Hold On (I'm On My Way)" - 2:49
"The Land of the Free" - 3:34
"The Soldier" - 3:46

Personnel 
 Chris de Burgh – vocals, acoustic piano, guitars
 Nigel Hopkins – keyboards, orchestrations
 Graham Kearns – guitars
 Phil Palmer – guitars
 Jennifer Maidman – dobro, mandolin, ukulele, bass guitar 
 Danny Cummings – drums, percussion 
 Mark White – trumpet, flugelhorn 
 Geoffrey Richardson – violin 
 Jakko Jakszyk – backing vocals 
 Ffion Wilkins – backing vocals

Production 
 Chris de Burgh – producer, sleeve design 
 Chris Porter – producer, recording, mixing 
 Oli Jacobs – engineer 
 Patrick Phillips – recording assistant 
 Alex Hutchinson – art direction, sleeve design 
 Kelly Pepper – sleeve design
 Harley-Moon Kemp – photography

References

2016 albums
Chris de Burgh albums